Takmachik is a village in the Leh district of the Indian union territory of Ladakh. It is located in the Khalsi tehsil, around 14 km from the Khaltsi and 112 km west of the district headquarters Leh.

Demographics
According to the 2011 census of India, Takmachik has 70 households. The effective literacy rate (i.e. the literacy rate of population excluding children aged 6 and below) is 65.36%.

Tourism
In August 2011, Tamakchik was formally launched as a tourist destination by the Ladakh Environment and Health Organization (LEHO). LEHO also held a workshop on Organic farming and Sustainable village Development to promote organic cultivation in the village.

Described as the first eco-model village of Ladakh, Tamachik is known for its authentic Ladakhi food and traditional culture. The Student Association for Village Environment (SAVE) -Takmachik is a local organization that maintains cleanliness and hygiene in the village.

References

Villages in Khalsi tehsil